Adnan Suleiman Hassan Adous is a retired Jordanian footballer of Palestinian origin who played for Al-Baqa'a and the Jordan national football team.  
 

International goals

With U-20

With Senior
Scores and results list Jordan's goal tally first.

Honors and Participation in International Tournaments

In WAFF Championships 
2012 WAFF Championship 
2014 WAFF Championship

References

External links

1987 births
Living people
Jordanian footballers
Jordanian people of Palestinian descent
Sportspeople from Amman
Al-Wehdat SC players
Al-Baqa'a Club players
Al-Ramtha SC players
Association football midfielders
Jordan international footballers
Jordanian Pro League players